Eutrinita is a monotypic moth genus of the family Erebidae. Its only species, Eutrinita ferruginea, is found in Trinidad. Both the genus and the species were first described by George Hampson in 1924.

References

Calpinae
Monotypic moth genera